Aughertree is a village in northern Cumbria, England. It is situated near to the  villages of Caldbeck and Torpenhow, but closer to the main local centre Ireby and is in the parish of Ireby and Uldale.

There are at least three Iron Age settlements on the nearby fell, a neolithic causeway along with several burial mounds that have been extensively excavated in earlier centuries but without sufficient recording or controls.

It used to be a much larger village with several taverns or pubs but none now remain. Some sites of former houses and farms can be seen but these are long gone.

A historic funeral road to Uldale Old Church starts in the hamlet and follows a footpath and bridleway.

Governance
Aughertree is part of the parliamentary constituency of Workington. In the December 2019 general election, the Tory candidate for Workington, Mark Jenkinson, was elected the MP, overturning a 9.4 per cent Labour majority from the 2017 election to eject shadow environment secretary Sue Hayman by a margin of 4,136 votes. Until the December 2019 general election The Labour Party has won the seat in the constituency in every general election since 1979.The Conservative Party has only been elected once in Workington since World War II, at the 1976 by-election.

Before Brexit, its residents were covered by the North West England European Parliamentary Constituency.

References

Villages in Cumbria
Allerdale